The 1980–81 Eredivisie season was the 21st season of the Eredivisie, the top level of ice hockey in the Netherlands. Nine teams participated in the league, and the Heerenveen Flyers won the championship.

Regular season

Playoffs

External links
Nederlandse IJshockey Bond

Neth
Eredivisie (ice hockey) seasons
Ere